
AIDS Wolf was a Canadian noise rock band, founded in Montreal in 2003, by the graphic arts team of Chloe Lum (aka Special Deluxe) and Yannick Desranleau (aka Hiroshima Thunder), otherwise known as Seripop. They were joined by Myles Broscoe (late of Arcade Fire), Chris Taylor (aka Barbarian Destroyer), Nick Kuepfer, André Guérette (aka Him, the Maji), and Alex Moskos. The band was known for playing modified consumer electronics and analog synthesizers, for giving creative names to instruments, and for being “weird for the sake of being weird.” On their label's band page, they stated "We are a fucking cult and will cause you harm and ill will," then added "The 9 Principles of AIDS Wolf".

Name
According to Chloe Lum, the name "AIDS Wolf" came from an urban legend wherein wolves carry AIDS and pass it to house pets who then pass it on to people, although she did not offer evidence of this legend. At another time, Lum stated "My partner and I were on a road trip in Ohio, and it just came to us. It was a universal message. It's a combination of our spirit peers in An Albatross (animal) and The Sick Lipstick (R.I.P.) (illness). It fits, because we're a little bit no–wave and a little bit hardcore, like each of those bands. It's also a message that we as humans must take care for our animal siblings as their health is a barometer of our own survival."

History
The band co-produced the EP, Live Deth (2005), with the American label Kitty Play Records. It then produced a two-song cassette called Freedom Summer, which was released by Pasalymany Tapes. That same year, the label Blood of the Drash released their four-track EP The Fugue. The band then went on tour through Canada and the US, with their reputation for performing in a "completely out of hand" fashion preceding their arrival in each city.

In 2005, the band signed with Skin Graft Records and, in 2006, released the album The Lovvers LP, which received generally fair reviews,
as did 2008's Cities of Glass. One critic cited Cities of Glass as being "violent, dirty, and really good."

The praise continued with the band's 2010 album, March to the Sea. Two albums released in 2011--Ma vie banale avant-garde and Live: An Insane and Abstract Hell (Dedicated To Two Dudes From Rusted Shut), got little notice. In between albums, there were several EPS, and split releases with a variety of bands.

The band tended to tour the US only in promotion of its albums although, to promote Ma vie banale avant-garde, the band staged Nocturne, a show with 3D projections (glasses supplied) at the Musée d'art contemporain de Montréal. It then went on a month-long tour of the US.

In March 2012, the band—now down to the trio of Desranleau, Lum and Moskos, announced that it had broken up due to time constraints.

Discography

Albums
 The Lovvers LP (2006), Skin Graft Records (vinyl format) & Lovepump United Records (cd format)
 Cities of Glass (2008), Skin Graft Records (cd), Lovepump United Records (vinyl)
 March to the Sea (2010), Skin Graft Records
 Ma vie banale avant-garde (2011), Lovepump United Records
 An Insane and Abstract Hell (Dedicated To Two Dudes From Rusted Shut) (2011), Zum Records

Splits
 AIDS Wolf/Dmonstrations/Pre/Crack und Ultra Eczema (2006), Lovepump United Records
 Clash of the Life-Force Warriors, AIDS Wolf vs. Athletic Automaton (2007), Skin Graft Records
 Live Dates (2007), with Pre, Skin Graft Records
 Pluck Out Glass Eyes (2008), with Night Wounds, Nail In The Coffin Records
 AIDS Wolf/Satanized (2010), with Satanized, Badmaster Records & Suicide Tax Records

EPs
 Live Deth (2005), Kitty Play Records
 The Fugue (2005), Blood of the Drash Records
 Chipped Teeth (2008), SlowBoy Records
 Pas Rapport (2009), Independent
 Dustin' Off The Sphynx (2009), Skin Graft Records
 Very Friendly remix (2010), Lovepump United Records
 Soaked in Oil (2011), We Are Busy Bodies

Singles
 "Freedom Summer" (2005), Pasalymany Tapes
 "Can-D" / "Chew-Z" (2012), Deathbomb Arc
 "Soaked in Oil / "Foreign Hairs" (2012), We Are Busy Bodies

See also

 Noise music
 Noise rock
 Experimental rock
 Music of Canada
 List of bands from Canada
 Canadian rock

References

External links
 AIDS Wolf website
 Skingraft Records
 Lovepump United Records
 Interview with AIDS Wolf on Jekyll and Hyde. By Oren Siegel and Oded Fluss, Israel

Musical groups established in 2003
Musical groups disestablished in 2012
Canadian indie rock groups
Musical groups from Montreal
Canadian noise rock groups